Fidel Francisco Martínez Tenorio (born 15 February 1990) is an Ecuadorian footballer who currently plays as a winger for Liga MX club Tijuana and the Ecuador national team.

Club career

Youth club career
Martínez started his career with Caribe Junior, where the Ecuadorian star played during his youth years. He showed his skills in the 2007 Pan American Games held in Brazil, where the Ecuadorian team won the gold medal, with Martínez a key player. Independiente José Terán acquired his services and then sold him to Cruzeiro for an unknown fee.

Associação Atlética Caldense

In 2009 Martínez was loaned to Associação Atlética Caldense where he played the Mineiro championship.

Deportivo Quito

2010 season
After a move to Deportivo Quito, Martínez debuted on 16 October 2010 against El Nacional. He scored his only goal of the season against ESPOLI. Martínez finished his debut season with nine games, one goal and one assist.

2011 season
Martínez played in thirty games in 2011, assisting five times and scoring nine goals, one of which was in the first leg of the Serie A final against Emelec. Martínez scored his first goal of the 2011 season on 14 May, against Quito club Espoli. He would go on to score seven more league goals, including a vital finish past the Emelec goalkeeper, as his side became champions of the 2011 season.

2012 season
Martínez kicked of the 2012 season against Macara. On 7 February 2012, he played his first ever Copa Libertadores match against Guadalajara. On 7 March, Martínez scored his first ever goal in the tournament against Velez Sarsfield in an emphatic 3–0 win over the Argentine team. On 11 March, he scored his first league goal against Deportivo Cuenca in a 4–1 away win. On 17 April, Martínez played a vital game against Mexican giants Guadalajara in a historic 5–0 win, scoring the third goal in the 65th minute. Martínez played all six games of the 2012 Copa Libertadores group stage, contributing two goals and two assists to help Deportivo Quito qualify to the last 16, an accomplishment not achieved since the 1989 Copa Libertadores. He scored his third Copa Libertadores goal in the round of 16 against powerful Chilean club Universidad de Chile in a 4–1 win.

Tijuana

2012–13 season
On 22 May 2012, president of Deportivo Quito Fernando Mantilla confirmed the purchase of Martínez by Mexican side Tijuana for an undisclosed fee. Martínez made his professional debut with Xolos on 20 July, coming on as a substitute in a 2–0 win over Puebla. Martínez scored his first goal for the club in a Copa MX match against Pumas, in a 2–2 away draw. On 2 December, Martínez and Tijuana won their first ever first division league title, with Martínez assisting both goals in Tijuana's 2–0 away victory over Toluca. Martínez scored his goal of the year in a 4–0 Copa Libertadores win against San Jose of Bolivia, while also assisting one goal. He later scored a late winner against Colombia's Millonarios in the last minute, and against Brazilian giants Atlético Mineiro in a 2–2 home draw, scoring a total of four goals in ten Copa Libertadores games played.

2013–14 season
For the 2013–14 Liga MX season, Martínez was given the club's number 10 jersey. On 4 August, Martínez scored his first goal of the season, in a 1–2 loss to Monarcas Morelia. A week later on 10 August, he scored his second, in a 2–0 home win over Pumas. On 23 August he scored his third goal, in a 1–1 home draw against Santos Laguna. On 9 August, Martínez scored his first ever CONCACAF Champions League goal in a group match against Firpo, winning 1–0. On 7 September, Martínez scored his first brace of the season in a 3–0 home win over Veracruz. On 16 September, he scored in a 2–2 away draw against Guadalajara. On 4 October, he scored the winning goal in a 1–0 home win over Querétaro.

Leones Negros UdeG

2014–15 Season
On 4 June 2014, Martínez joined Leones Negros UdeG on loan from Tijuana.

On 20 August 2014, Martínez scored and gave Leones Negros their first Liga MX victory in over 20 years in a win against León.

On 29 August, Martínez scored against his former team Tijuana as the match ended a 1–1 draw. On 12 January 2015, Martínez scored his first goal of the year in a 1–0 win against Monterrey.

Pumas UNAM
On 24 May 2015, Martínez joined UNAM. He enjoyed a good first year with Pumas, registering four goals and six assists in the regular season. As Pumas advanced to the Ligilla, Martinez scored in the quarter-finals to give his side a 1–0 win over Veracruz and advance them to the semi-finals. Martinez started the Clausura 2016 tournament having lost his regular starting spot to new signing Luis Quinones; despite limited game time Martínez scored a last minute equaliser in a 1–1 draw away to Atlas.

International career

Martínez was called up for the Ecuador senior team in 2008, debuting on 17 December in a tournament in Oman, scoring the winning goal against Iran. He was called up to play in the 2009 South American Youth Championship. After a five-year absence from the national team, Martínez was called up by Reinaldo Rueda for 2014 FIFA World Cup qualification matches against Uruguay and Chile.

Career statistics

Club

International

International goals
Scores and results list Ecuador's goal tally first.

Honours

Club
Deportivo Quito
Serie A: 2011

Tijuana
Liga MX: Apertura 2012

International
Ecuador U-20
Pan American Games: 2007 Gold Medal

Individual
Copa Libertadores Top scorer: 2020

References

External links

Martínez's FEF player card 

1990 births
Living people
People from Nueva Loja
Ecuadorian emigrants to Mexico
Naturalized citizens of Mexico
Association football forwards
Ecuadorian footballers
Ecuador international footballers
Cruzeiro Esporte Clube players
S.D. Quito footballers
Club Tijuana footballers
Shanghai Shenhua F.C. players
Leones Negros UdeG footballers
Club Universidad Nacional footballers
Atlas F.C. footballers
Ecuadorian Serie A players
Liga MX players
Chinese Super League players
2014 FIFA World Cup players
2015 Copa América players
Copa América Centenario players
2021 Copa América players
Ecuadorian expatriate footballers
Expatriate footballers in Brazil
Expatriate footballers in Mexico
Expatriate footballers in China
Pan American Games gold medalists for Ecuador
Pan American Games medalists in football
Footballers at the 2007 Pan American Games
Medalists at the 2007 Pan American Games